Street Sounds Electro 5 is the fifth compilation album in a series and was released 1984 on the StreetSounds label. The album was released on LP and cassette and contains nine electro music and old school hip hop tracks mixed by Bunny Rock Inc. featuring DJ Maurice and DJ Noel Watson (The Watson Brothers).

Track listing

References

External links
 Street Sounds Electro 5 at Discogs

1984 compilation albums
Hip hop compilation albums
Electro compilation albums